Korea Maritime & Ocean University is South Korea's most prestigious national university for maritime study, transportation science and engineering. It is located in Yeongdo-gu in Busan. The university is also known for having its whole campus located inside an island.

History
The university was established in November 1945 after Korea had been liberated from Japanese occupation (World War II). Chinhae High Seamans School, a maritime institution with a majority of Korean students until the liberation of Korea, was re-established with Korean faculty and students under the leadership of Lee Si-hyung. The school became a national university immediately after its foundation, and was renamed Chinhae High Merchant Seamans School.

After the Korean War it was merged with other similar institutions and moved to Busan. The name was changed to the National Maritime College in 1956.

In 1992, the college became a university with a graduate school, and was given its current name.

The university is one of the earliest and prestigious national post-secondary educational institutions in South Korea, and the only post-secondary institution that specializes in maritime sciences and engineering.

The university name was changed from "Korea Maritime University" to "Korea Maritime and Ocean University" on September 1, 2013.

The university name was changed from "Korea Maritime and Ocean University" to "Korea Maritime & Ocean University" on February 1, 2019.

Academics

Undergraduate colleges
 Maritime Sciences
 - Maritime Transportation Science
 - Marine System Engineering
 - Navigation Science
 - Marine Engineering
 - Coast Guard Studies
 - Offshore Plant Management
 - Marine Information Technology
 - Global Maritime Studies

 Ocean Science and Technology
 - Naval Architecture and Ocean Systems Engineering
 - Ocean Engineering
 - Energy Resources Engineering
 - Architecture Ocean Space
 - Ocean Science
 - Marine Bio-science
 - Ocean Physical Education

Engineering
 - Mechanical Engineering Logistics
 - Electrical and Electronics Engineering
 - Information Technology
 - Control and Automation Engineering
 - Radio Communication Engineering
 - Data Information
 - Environmental engineering
 - Civil Engineering

 International Studies
 - Shipping Management
 - Maritime Law
 - International Trade and Economics
 - International Commerce
 - Maritime Administration
 - English Language and Literature
 - East Asian Studies
 - European Studies

Korean Language Course 
 - 10 Weeks Course, 4 Semester a Year
 - Korean Vocabulary and Grammar, Listening, Speaking, Reading, Writing.

Graduate schools

General Graduate Schools 
 Engineering (18 departments)
 Natural Science (2 departments)
 Humanities and Social Studies (8 departments)

Professional Graduate Schools
 Graduate School of Maritime Industry Studies
 Ocean Science and Technology School
 Graduate School of Education

See also
List of national universities in South Korea
List of universities and colleges in South Korea
Education in Korea

References

External links
 Korea Maritime and Ocean University (Korean)
 Korea Maritime and Ocean University (English)

Universities and colleges in Busan
Coast guard academies
Naval academies
Educational institutions established in 1945
Korea Maritime and Ocean University
1945 establishments in Korea
National universities and colleges in South Korea